Wykeham Priory was a nunnery in Wykeham, North Yorkshire, England.  It was established between 1140 and 1160 and was destroyed by fire during the reign of Edward III.

In the mid-18th century, Wykeham Abbey was built on the site of the former priory.

References

Monasteries in North Yorkshire
12th-century establishments in England
Christian monasteries established in the 12th century